This page lists all described species of the spider family Diguetidae accepted by the World Spider Catalog :

Diguetia

Diguetia Simon, 1895
 D. albolineata (O. Pickard-Cambridge, 1895) — USA, Mexico
 D. andersoni Gertsch, 1958 — USA
 D. canities (McCook, 1890) (type) — USA, Mexico
 D. c. dialectica Chamberlin, 1924 — Mexico
 D. c. mulaiki Gertsch, 1958 — USA
 D. catamarquensis (Mello-Leitão, 1941) — Argentina
 D. imperiosa Gertsch & Mulaik, 1940 — USA, Mexico
 D. mojavea Gertsch, 1958 — USA
 D. propinqua (O. Pickard-Cambridge, 1896) — Mexico
 D. signata Gertsch, 1958 — USA, Mexico
 D. stridulans Chamberlin, 1924 — Mexico

Segestrioides

Segestrioides Keyserling, 1883
 S. badia (Simon, 1903) — Brazil
 S. bicolor Keyserling, 1883 (type) — Peru
 S. copiapo Platnick, 1989 — Chile
 S. tofo Platnick, 1989 — Chile

References

Diguetidae